Lovers of Woomuk-Baemi, also known as A Short Love Affair, is a 1990 South Korean film directed by Jang Sun-woo.

Synopsis
The film is a melodrama about the love affair of a tailor from the countryside.

Cast
 Park Joong-hoon... Il-do
 Choi Myung-gil... Gong-ryae
 Yoo Hye-ri... Sae-daek
 Lee Dae-keun... Park Seok-hee
 Choi Joo-bong... Nam-su
 Kim Young-ok... Il-do's mother
 Shin Chaong-shik... Il-do's father
 Chung Sang-chul... Na-ri's father
 Seo Kap-sook... Na-ri's mother
 Yang Taek-jo... Choi

References

Bibliography
 
 

1990 films
1990s Korean-language films
South Korean drama films
Films directed by Jang Sun-woo
Grand Prize Paeksang Arts Award (Film) winners